The 4th Independent Battery Wisconsin Light Artillery  was an artillery battery that served in the Union Army during the American Civil War.

Service
The 4th Independent Battery was mustered into service at Racine, Wisconsin, on October 10, 1861.

The battery was mustered out on July 3, 1865.

Total strength and casualties
The 4th Independent Battery initially recruited 151 officers and men.  An additional 100 men were recruited as replacements, for a total of 251
men.

The battery suffered 3 enlisted men killed in action or died of wounds and 22 enlisted men who died of disease, for a total of 25 fatalities.

Commanders
 Captain John F. Vallee
 Captain George B. Easterly
 Captain Dorman L. Noggle

Notable people
 William Penn Powers, son of David J. Powers, was a first lieutenant.  He was previously enlisted in the 1st Wisconsin Heavy Artillery Regiment.

See also

 List of Wisconsin Civil War units
 Wisconsin in the American Civil War

Notes

References
The Civil War Archive

Military units and formations established in 1861
Military units and formations disestablished in 1865
Units and formations of the Union Army from Wisconsin
Wisconsin
1861 establishments in Wisconsin